Latipah binti Omar is a Malaysian politician and former serves as Malacca State Executive Councillor.

Election results

Honours

Honours of Malaysia
  :
  Member of the Order of the Defender of the Realm (AMN) (2011)
  Officer of the Order of the Defender of the Realm (KMN) (2015)
  :
  Companion Class I of the Order of Malacca (DMSM) – Datuk (2009)
  Knight Commander of the Order of Malacca (DCSM) - Datuk Wira (2020)

References 

Malaysian people of Malay descent
Malaysian Muslims
United Malays National Organisation politicians
21st-century Malaysian politicians
Members of the Malacca State Legislative Assembly
Women MLAs in Malacca
Malacca state executive councillors
Members of the Order of the Defender of the Realm
Officers of the Order of the Defender of the Realm
People from Malacca
Living people
Year of birth missing (living people)
21st-century Malaysian women politicians